Lee Young-min (born 20 December 1973) is a South Korean former footballer and current manager of Bucheon FC 1995. He played as defender.

Career
He was appointed as an interim manager of FC Anyang on 16 June 2015. He was promoted to full-time manager on 9 November.

References

1973 births
Living people
Association football defenders
South Korean footballers
South Korean football managers
Pohang Steelers players
Goyang KB Kookmin Bank FC players
K League 1 players
Korea National League players
FC Anyang managers
Sportspeople from Busan